Paris Saint-Germain Football Club was founded in 1970. Since that time, PSG has competed in numerous nationally and internationally organised tournaments, and 492 players have played in at least one match with the club's first team. 147 of these players have graduated from the Paris Saint-Germain Academy.

The list below features all players who have played in between 25 and 99 matches in official competitions for Paris Saint-Germain. Among them are club greats such as Ronaldinho, Carlos Bianchi and Jean Djorkaeff.

Jean Djorkaeff was both PSG's first star and first French international player. The formidable right-back shocked French football with his move to the Parisians, whom he led to the Division 2 title in 1971. His son, Youri Djorkaeff, also played for the club, following his father's footsteps and guiding them to the UEFA Cup Winners' Cup title in 1996.

Carlos Bianchi signed for PSG in 1977 and had an exceptional first season, scoring 37 goals in 38 matches. In 1978, with 28 goals, he was once again crowned France's top scorer, but the Argentine goal machine would never win a trophy in France.

Ronaldinho also didn't need to win a trophy with PSG to become a club legend. The Brazilian star thrilled fans at Parc des Princes with his mercurial dribbling skills as well as producing some stunning performances and goals, away to Marseille and Guingamp.

Key

General

 Appearances and goals are for first-team official games, including those in Ligue 1, Ligue 2, Division 3, Coupe de France, Coupe de la Ligue, Trophée des Champions, UEFA Champions League, UEFA Europa League, UEFA Super Cup, FIFA Club World Cup, and several now-defunct competitions — namely the UEFA Cup Winners' Cup and UEFA Intertoto Cup. Substitute appearances are included.
 Players are listed according to the total number of games played. If two or more players are tied, their rankings are determined as follows:

Table headers

 Player – Nationality, first name and last name.
 Position – Role on the field of play.
 Paris Saint-Germain – Playing career at the club.
 Appearances – Number of games played.
 Goals – Number of goals scored.
 Assists – Number of assists delivered.
 Source – Reference source of the player's information.

Positions and colors

Players

Statistics correct as of match played 29 January 2023. Bold denotes an active player for the club.

75–99 appearances

50–74 appearances

25–49 appearances

References

External links

Official websites
PSG.FR – Site officiel du Paris Saint-Germain
Paris Saint-Germain – Ligue 1
Paris Saint-Germain - UEFA.com

 
Paris Saint-Germain F.C.
Association football player non-biographical articles
Paris Saint-Germain F.C. players